Tabulator may refer to:

 Tabulating machine, a punched card data processing machine that preceded the computer
 Tab key (↹), a standard keyboard key originally called the "tabulator key"
 Tabulator, a data browser and editor originally developed by Tim Berners-Lee
 A vote-counting machine